The Hon. James G. Arner (born 1951 in Brookville, Pennsylvania) is the current two-term President Judge of the Pennsylvania Courts of Common Pleas of Clarion County, Pennsylvania of the 18th district.

Arner is a graduate of Temple University Beasley School of Law (1978), Grove City College (1973), and Colorado State University (1975). He was elected in 1999 and is a member of the Pennsylvania Conference of State Trial Judges, Ethics Committee/Legislative Committee, and the Domestic Violence Bench Book Committee. He was previously in private practice.

References

1951 births
Living people
Colorado State University alumni
Grove City College alumni
People from Brookville, Pennsylvania
Temple University Beasley School of Law alumni
Judges of the Pennsylvania Courts of Common Pleas